Maurice Hugh Stanbrough (2 September 1870 – 15 December 1904) was an English footballer and cricketer.

Hugh Stanbrough was educated at Charterhouse School and Caius College, Cambridge. He played football for Cambridge University from 1890 to 1892, when he graduated and became a schoolmaster. He played football for a number of clubs and earned one cap for the England national team, a 1–1 draw against Wales on 18 March 1895.

He also played for Eastbourne from 1895 until his last game on 16 April 1898 against Marlow.

Honours 
Old Carthusians

 FA Amateur Cup: 1893–94
 London Senior Cup: 1894–95
 London Charity Cup: 1895–96
 Arthur Dunn Challenge Cup: 1902–03

References

External links 

1870 births
1904 deaths
Alumni of Gonville and Caius College, Cambridge
England amateur international footballers
English cricketers
People educated at Charterhouse School
Sportspeople from Shropshire
English footballers
England international footballers
Old Carthusians F.C. players
Association football midfielders
Cambridge University A.F.C. players
Corinthian F.C. players
Casuals F.C. players
Eastbourne Town F.C. players